Kern Valley Airport  is a public airport located in the Kern River Valley,  south of Kernville in Kern County, California, United States. It serves the Lake Isabella area in the Southern Sierra Nevada. 

The airport is mostly used for general aviation.

Facilities 

 Runway 17/35: , surface: asphalt

Use 
The airport has an average of 28 operations per day.

20 aircraft are based at the airport.

See also
 List of airports in Kern County, California

References

External links 

Airports in Kern County, California
Kern River Valley
Sierra Nevada (United States)